Kardijan (also Romanized as Kardījān and Kordījān; also known as Gardījān, Kardīān, and Qardīān) is a village in Mazraeh Now Rural District, in the Central District of Ashtian County, Markazi Province, Iran. At the 2006 census, its population was 1,667, in 409 families.

References 

Populated places in Ashtian County